The elections to Ceredigion County Council were held on 1 May 2008 along with elections to other Welsh councils, plus the London Mayor and  Assembly Elections, Metropolitan English councils and Non Metropolitan English councils elections. All 42 council seats are up for election. It was preceded by the 2004 election and followed by the 2012 election.

The previous council was controlled by Independents in coalition with the Liberal Democrat group and the single Labour member. Since 2004, there have been no by-elections to the council (the only council in Wales not to have any during the last four years). Nominations for the council elections closed on 4 April 2008. The last council meeting before the elections (when the council was formally dissolved) was held on 17 April 2008. The composition of the council prior to the elections was:

 Independents 16 
 Plaid Cymru 16 
 Liberal Democrats 9 
 Labour 1

2 Independents had defected to Plaid Cymru and a further 2 Independents had retired. All existing councillors bar the 2 retirees are up for re-election.

Election results: overview

|-bgcolor=#F6F6F6
| colspan=2 style="text-align: right; margin-right: 1em" | Total
| style="text-align: right;" | 42
| colspan=5 |
| style="text-align: right;" | 27,718
| style="text-align: right;" | 
|-
|}

All parties received a higher share of the vote than in 2004. This was in part due to a fall in the number of non-party independents standing and previous non-party independents joining the independent grouping, but also due to a number of parties  (namely UKIP and Llais Ceredigion) not standing candidates this time around.

Plaid Cymru made six gains. They gained a seat in the ward of Aberystwyth, Penparcau, as well as the wards of Cardigan, Mwldan, Cardigan, Teifi, Ciliau Aeron, Llanfarian, Llangeitho and Melindwr. The party also made four losses: Llandysilio-gogo, Llansantffraid, Tirymynach and Troedyraur.

The Liberal Democrats made two gains, Tirymynach and Aberaeron, but lost Melindwr.

The three non-party independents from 2004 were re-elected as Independents (Haydn Lewis in Pen-parc, Gethin James in Aberporth and Ray Quant in Borth), as well as John Ivor Williams, who had held his seat in 2004 under the label Cymraeg/Welsh. A single candidate was elected as a non-party independent (Gareth Lloyd Cletwr in Llandysilio-gogo).

Nine members of the original Council elected in 1995 were again returned.

Ward Results

Aberaeron (one seat)

Aberporth (one seat)

Aberteifi, Mwldan (one seat)

Aberteifi, Rhydyfuwch (one seat)

Aberteifi, Teifi (one seat)

Aberystwyth Bronglais (one seat)

Aberystwyth Central (one seat)

Aberystwyth North (one seat)

Aberystwyth Penparcau (two seats)

Aberystwyth Rheidol (one seat)

Beulah (one seat)

Borth (one seat)

Capel Dewi (one seat)
Cllr Peter Davies (Ind, Capel Dewi) was elected unopposed in 2008. He was first elected in 2004 (beating a Plaid Cymru candidate by 239 votes (40%) and sits on the Development Control Committee and the Standards Committee.

Ceulanamaesmawr (one seat)

Ciliau Aeron (one seat)
Plaid Cymru had captured the seat in a by-election.

Faenor (one seat)

Lampeter (two seats)

Llanarth (one seat)
Cllr. Eurfyl Evans (Lib Dem, Llanarth) was elected unopposed in 2008. He was first elected in 1995 (holding the ward from Cllr. Alan Thomas) and won re-election in 2004 by 188 votes over Plaid Cymru (31%) and in the last Cabinet (that was dissolved at the same time as the last meeting of the council) was the Cabinet member with responsibility for Economic Development

Llanbadarn Fawr Padarn (one seat)

Llanbadarn Fawr Sulien (one seat)

Llandyfriog (one seat)

Llandysiliogogo (one seat)

Llandysul Town (one seat)

Llanfarian (one seat)
Alun Lloyd Jones had left the Plaid Cymru group and joined the Independents after the 1999 election. However, since the 2004 election he rejoined the party.

Llanfihangel Ystrad (one seat)

Llangeitho (one seat)
Cllr. David Evans (Plaid Cymru, Llangeitho) was elected unopposed in 2008. First elected in 1999 (gaining the seat from the Liberal Democrats as an Independent candidate) joined Plaid Cymru at the close of nominations in 2008. As an Independent member he sat on the Development Control Committee and was vice chair of the Environmental Services and Housing Committee.

Llangybi (one seat)

Llanrhystud (one seat)

Llansantffraed (one seat)

Llanwenog (one seat)

Lledrod (one seat)

Melindwr (one seat)

New Quay (one seat)

Penbryn (one seat)

Penparc (one seat)

Tirymynach (one seat)

Trefeurig (one seat)

Tregaron (one seat)
Cllr. Catherine Jane Hughes (Plaid Cymru, Tregaron) was elected in 2004 defeating an Independent candidate by 35 votes (5%) and was vice chair of the Social Service Committee as well as serving on the Development Control Committee and Education Committee.

Troedyraur (one seat)

Ystwyth one seat)

By-elections 2008-12

Aberystwyth Rheidol 2008
A by-election was held in the Aberystwyth Rheidol ward following the resignation of Liberal Democrat councillor Eric Griffiths.

References

External links
A guide to the elections in Ceredigion

2008 Welsh local elections
2008
21st century in Ceredigion